Ama Bame Busia is a Ghanaian politician and a former member of the council of state. She is the sister of the late Kofi Abrefa Busia, former Ghanaian prime minister.

Education 
Busia had her primary education at  Wenchi Methodist School and Methodist Middle Girls' School in Kumasi. She trained as a teacher at the Komenda Training College. In 1959, she went into exile in London with her brother, Kofi Abrefa Busia and there she studied Institutional Management and Catering at the Regent Street Polytechnic.

Awards and recognition 
She was recently honored as one of the most inspiring women in Ghana in the area of politics.

References 

Living people
Members of the Council of State (Ghana)
21st-century Ghanaian women politicians
Year of birth missing (living people)